Oqbe Kibrom Ruesom (born 1 January 1998) is an Eritrean long-distance runner. He qualified to represent Eritrea at the 2020 Summer Olympics in Tokyo 2021, competing in men's marathon.

References

External links
 

 

1998 births
Living people
Eritrean male long-distance runners
Athletes (track and field) at the 2020 Summer Olympics
Olympic athletes of Eritrea
20th-century Eritrean people
21st-century Eritrean people